Juan Paladino (born 17 February 1925) was a Uruguayan foil and sabre fencer. He competed at the 1948 and 1960 Summer Olympics. He finished second in the 1955 Pan American Games sabre team competition (with Teodoro Goliardi, Ricardo Rimini, and the non-Olympian José Lardizábal).

References

External links
 

1925 births
Possibly living people
Uruguayan male foil fencers
Uruguayan male sabre fencers
Olympic fencers of Uruguay
Fencers at the 1948 Summer Olympics
Fencers at the 1960 Summer Olympics
Pan American Games silver medalists for Uruguay
Fencers at the 1955 Pan American Games
Sportspeople from Montevideo
Pan American Games medalists in fencing
Medalists at the 1955 Pan American Games
20th-century Uruguayan people